Fagersta is a locality and the seat of Fagersta Municipality in Västmanland County, Sweden, with 11,130 inhabitants in 2010.

Geography 
The city is located at the junction of two railways between Ludvika-Västerås and Avesta (Krylbo)-Örebro, in the heart of the historic Bergslagen region which is rich in copper and iron ore. The 60th parallel north passes through the town.

History 
There has been mining activity in the Fagersta area since the 15th century but it was not organized until the 17th century and was not made a corporation until 1873, when Fagersta Bruks AB was founded.

Fagersta was made a city in 1944 when the industrial hot spot of Fagersta merged with its service-oriented neighbour Västanfors. It is now the seat of Fagersta Municipality.  The Fagersta airspace surveillance tower is a Second World War observation platform located to protect a nearby steel mill.

Industry 
Today's industry is focused on hard metal tools (Seco Tools AB and Atlas Copco Secoroc AB) and stainless steel products (Fagersta Stainless AB and OUTOKUMPU Stainless Tubular Products AB).

Notable natives 
Ulf Samuelsson, ice hockey player (NHL)
Tomas Sandström, ice hockey player (NHL)
The Hives, garage rock band
59 Times the Pain, garage rock band
Johan August Brinell, metallurgist and inventor of the Brinell hardness test at the Fagersta Iron and Steel Works in 1900
Kjell Ramstedt, Drummer for punk rock band (No Fun At All)

References 

Municipal seats of Västmanland County
Swedish municipal seats
Populated places in Västmanland County
Populated places in Fagersta Municipality